François de Candie was a savoyard nobleman named Vidame of Geneva from 1377 to 1385. He was born in Chambéry (circa 1338), the son of Manfredo and Beatrice of Bâgé, descendent from female lineage of William I of Geneva (+1195). He was brother to Humberto de Candie, lord of Chaffardon and Moraz in Chambéry, and Jean de Candie, lord of Villeneuve, St-Ombre, Montagnole, and Chanaz, lordships granted by the counts of Savoy in 1377 to the favour of the de Candie brothers loyals to the House of Savoy.

In 1368, François de Candie received from princess Mathide of Savoy the lordship on the castles of Salagine in Bloye and Rumilly, Haute-Savoie.; and in 1377 appointed savoyard regal captain of the castle of l'Ile sur le Rhône by count Peter of Geneva, in addition, appointed by Pope Gregory XI in 1377 Vatican-Savoyard regional representative Roman Catholic viscount of Geneve.

See also
 House of Candia

References

14th-century people from Savoy